Jahangiri is a surname. Notable people with the surname include:

Eshaq Jahangiri (born 1958), Iranian politician
Marjan Jahangiri (born 1962), British professor of cardiac surgery
Nader Jahangiri (born 1945), Iranian linguist
Reza Jahangiri (born 1978), American businessman